Ptychodon schuppi is a species of air-breathing land snail, a terrestrial pulmonate gastropod mollusk in the family Charopidae.

Distribution 
This species is endemic to Brazil.

See also 
 List of non-marine molluscs of Brazil

References 

Ptychodon
Endemic fauna of Brazil
Gastropods described in 1900
Taxonomy articles created by Polbot